Tank Subdivision formerly Frontier Region Tank is a subdivision in Khyber Pakhtunkhwa province of Pakistan. The region is named after Tank District which lies to the south-east and also borders South Waziristan to the north, south and west and  Lakki Marwat District to the north-east. The capital is Jandola however it is administered by the district coordination officer (DCO) of Tank District.

Geography and climate
The region is mostly covered by the dry Bhittani hills, gradually sloping from north-west towards south-east. Most of the streams which originate from the region are seasonal and normally end up in the arid plains of Dera Ismail Khan District.

The region experiences hot summers and cold winters. The summer season is from April to October with June, July and August as the hottest months. The winter season is from November to March with December, January and February as the coldest months.

Demography
Pashto is the first language of 97.5% of the population, and Punjabi – of 2.1%.
The main tribe in the region is the Bhittani, who also inhabit the frontier regions of Dera Ismail Khan and Bannu.

Notable people
Abdullah Nangyal

See also
Federally Administered Tribal Areas
Tank District

References

External links
Government of the Federally Administered Tribal Areas
Pakistani Federal Ministry of States and Frontier Regions

 
Frontier Regions
Frontier